Zinc finger protein 148 is a protein that in humans is encoded by the ZNF148 gene.

Interactions 

ZNF148 has been shown to interact with PTRF and P53.

See also 
 Zinc finger

References

Further reading

External links 
 

Transcription factors